Shellytown is an unincorporated community and census-designated place (CDP) in Blair County, Pennsylvania, United States. It was first listed as a CDP prior to the 2020 census.

The CDP is in eastern Blair County, in the southeastern part of Woodbury Township. It is bordered to the west by Clover Creek, a north-flowing tributary of the Frankstown Branch Juniata River. Clover Creek Road is the main street in the community, leading north  to Williamsburg and southwest  to Fredericksburg.

References 

Census-designated places in Blair County, Pennsylvania
Census-designated places in Pennsylvania